In mathematics, a topological semigroup is a semigroup that is simultaneously a topological space, and whose semigroup operation is continuous.

Every topological group is a topological semigroup.

See also

References

Topological algebra
Topological groups